Alireza Bakhatiari is the CEO of the Donya-e-Eqtesad Taban Media Group, otherwise known as DEN. The DEN encompasses the titles of, Donya-e-Eqtesad Daily, a Persian language economic newspaper, EcoIran economic internet TV, Tejarat-e-Farda a weekly business journal, EghtesadNews an economic news agency, and the Financial Tribune an English language economic newspaper.

References

Iranian chief executives
Living people
Year of birth missing (living people)
Place of birth missing (living people)
Iranian newspaper publishers (people)